Gagea jaeschkei is an Asian  species of plants in the lily family. It is native to Kazakhstan, Xinjiang, Tajikistan, Uzbekistan, Afghanistan, Pakistan, and northern India.

Gagea jaeschkei is a bulb-forming perennial up to 5 cm tall. Flowers are yellow in the front, dull purple on the backside.

formerly included
Gagea jaeschkei var. praecedens, now called Gagea gageoides

References

jaeschkei
Flora of Asia
Plants described in 1904